The 2010 Damascus International Film Festival is the 18th incarnation of the international film festival held in Damascus, Syria which ran from November 7 to 13, 2010. Prizes were awarded in three categories and a 222 films were shown in 18 categories during the course of the festival.

This edition of the Damascus International Film Festival, organised under the patronage of Syrian Minister of Culture Dr. Riad Ismat, opened with a ceremony at the Damascus Opera House, at which Turkish actress Türkan Şoray and Syrian actor Ghassan Massoud were among the guests of honor, and a screening of Honey directed by Semih Kaplanoğlu. The opening ceremony featured a respect parade for the nine Turkish people who lost their lives during the Gaza flotilla raid on May 31, 2010.

The festival close with a screening of Uncle Boonmee Who Can Recall His Past Lives directed by Apichatpong Weerasethakul.

Programs

Official Feature Competition 
 About Her Brother directed by Yoji Yamada
 Cell 211 directed by Daniel Monzón
 Confucius directed by Hu Mei
 Foxes directed by Mira Fornay
 Guards of Silence directed by Samir Zekra
 How I Ended This Summer (translit. Kak ya provyol etim letom) directed by Alexei Popogrebski
 If I Want to Whistle, I Whistle directed by Florin Şerban
 Cosmos directed by Reha Erdem
 Our Life directed by Daniele Luchetti
 The Princess of Montpensier directed by Bertrand Tavernier
 September Rain directed by Abdellatif Abdelhamid
 Never Let Me Go directed by Mark Romanek
 On The Path directed by Jasmila Žbanić
 Outside the Law directed by Rachid Bouchareb
 Please Do Not Disturb directed by Mohsen Abdolvahab
 Submarino directed by Thomas Vinterberg
 Sun Dress directed by Saeed Salmeen Al-Murry
 The Chord directed by Magdy El-Hawary
 The Hairdresser directed by Doris Dörrie
 Venezzia directed by Haik Gazarian
 Late December directed by Moez Kammoun
 The Mosque directed by Daoud Aoulad-Syad
 Clockwise directed by Khalifa al-Muraikhi

Official Program 
 A Woman, a Gun and a Noodle Shop directed by Zhang Yimou
 Another Year directed by Mike Leigh
 Biutiful directed by Alejandro González Iñárritu
 Chantrapas directed by Otar Iosseliani
 Departures directed by Yōjirō Takita
 The Secret in Their Eyes directed by Juan José Campanella
 Gran Torino directed by Clint Eastwood
 Honey directed by Semih Kaplanoğlu
 Poetry (translit. Shi) directed by Lee Chang-dong
 Film Socialisme directed by Jean-Luc Godard
 Somewhere directed by Sofia Coppola
 Soul Kitchen directed by Fatih Akın
 The Ghost Writer directed by Roman Polanski
 The White Ribbon directed by Michael Haneke
 On Tour directed by Mathieu Amalric
 Uncle Boonmee Who Can Recall His Past Lives directed by Apichatpong Weerasethakul
 A Prophet directed by Jacques Audiard
 Up directed by Pete Docter
 Burnt by the Sun 2: Prestanding (translit. Utomlyonnye solntsem 2: Predstoyanie) directed by Pete Docter
 Taming directed by Nidal Aldibs

Turkish Cinema 
 A Fairground Attraction directed by Mehmet Eryılmaz
 Waiting for Heaven directed by Derviş Zaim
 Climates directed by Nuri Bilge Ceylan
 My Father and My Son directed by Çağan Irmak
 Three Monkeys directed by Nuri Bilge Ceylan
 Umut directed by Yılmaz Güney
 Distant directed by Nuri Bilge Ceylan
 Egg directed by Semih Kaplanoğlu

See also 
 2010 in film

References

External links
  for the festival

Damascus International Film Festival
Damascus International Film Festival
2010 in Syria
Damascus International Film Festival
21st century in Damascus
November 2010 events in Syria